Matti ja Teppo is a Finnish folk duo made up of brothers Matti Tapio Ruohonen (born in Turku, Finland on 8 August 1949) and Teppo Ilmari Ruohonen (also born in Turku, on 1 March 1948) who have performed together since childhood. 

The duo studied violin and piano in their hometown Turku. Matti also studied guitar and songwriting, whereas Teppo became a lyricist. In 1972, the duo released their debut album, the self-titled album Matti ja Teppo. They established their own record label "M & T Production" in 1975 and have become one of the biggest selling artists in Finland, with many famous songs like "Kissankultaa", "Et voi tulla rajan taa", "Mä joka päivä töitä teen", "Ensimmäinen", "Kaiken takana on nainen", "Mä tanssin hullun lailla" and "Näitä polkuja tallaan". Many of their albums have been certified gold and platinum. 

Their older brother was the operatic tenor and voice pedagog Seppo Ruohonen (1946-2020).

Discography

Albums
1972: Matti ja Teppo
1975: Ota kiinni
1976: Cara mia
1977: Sait mitä hait
1981: Et voi tulla rajan taa
1982: Pidä itsestäsi huolta
1983: Minuun voit luottaa
1984: Kuulut aikaan parhaimpaan
1984: Lauluja sinulle
1986: Matti & Teppo 
1987: Matti ja Teppo '87
1989: Aito tunne
1989: Joulu on rakkautta
1990: Suuret valssisuosikit
1991: Taivaan merkit
1992: Jää mun luo
1994: Kaikki peliin
1995: Suuret valssisuosikit 2
1995: Toivon ja hiljaisuuden lauluja
1997: Luotuja kulkemaan
1998: Suuret valssisuosikit 3
1999: Toivon ja hiljaisuuden lauluja 2
2001: Ensimmäinen
2003: Hänelle 
2004: Joulun aika
2006: Pöytä täyteen
2006: Toivon ja hiljaisuuden lauluja 3
2008: Satoi tai paistoi
2010: Peruskallio
2012: Meidän paikka
2014: Yksinoikeudella
2015: 45 V. Juhlalevy
2017: Nostalgiaa
2019: Enemmän

Compilations
1979: Täyskymppi 1969–1979
1985: Parhaat 1
1986: Parhaat 2
1991: Kaksi alkuperäistä: Pidä itsestäsi huolta / Minuun voit luottaa
1993: Vauhti kiihtyy
2001: Kaikki hitit 
2002: Kaikkien aikojen valssisuosikit
2002: Näin se kesäloma toimii 
2004: 35. vuotisjuhlalevy 
2009: 40. vuotisjuhlalevy
2015: 45 V. Juhlalevy
2019: 50 v. juhlalevy

See also
List of best-selling music artists in Finland

References

External links
Official website
Discogs

Finnish musical duos
Sibling musical duos
Folk music duos
20th-century Finnish male singers
Finnish songwriters
Musicians from Turku
1948 births
1949 births
Living people
21st-century Finnish male singers